Spring Garden station may refer to one of these stations in Philadelphia, Pennsylvania:

Spring Garden station (Broad Street Line), a subway station
Spring Garden station (Broad–Ridge Spur), a former subway station
Spring Garden station (Market–Frankford Line), a rapid transit station
Spring Garden Street station, a former regional rail station

See also
Spring Garden (disambiguation)